Myles (established in 2013) is a self-drive car sharing company in India owned by Carzonrent in Delhi, India.

History 
Myles was launched in November 2013 by Sakshi Vij of Carzonrent.

She began her career in 2007, when she joined 'Myles’ parent company, Carzonrent India Private Limited (CIPL), as a part of the marketing team. 

In January 2019, MG Motor India announced a strategic partnership with Myles.
In October 2020, Toyota Motors India, and in August 2020, Maruti Suzuki India tied up with Myles to offer their cars on subscription.

Services 

In March 2016, the firm ran more than 1,000 cars across 23 cities in India.

References

Further reading
 Toyota website – https://www.toyotabharat.com/news/2020/tkm-joins-hands-with-myles-to-ramp-up-its-subscription-service.html
 Livemint – https://www.livemint.com/companies/news/maruti-suzuki-partners-myles-automotive-to-expand-vehicle-subscription-service-11598595185348.html

External links
 

Car rental companies of India
Carsharing
Indian companies established in 2013
Companies based in New Delhi